Sandy Grigsby is a public speaker, personal branding image specialist, empowerment photographer, certified high-performance coach, and founder of Briofive LLC, a photography studio located in Los Angeles, CA.  Grigsby was born in Switzerland to a Black and Native American father and Swiss mother, and raised in the San Francisco Bay Area.  Grigsby graduated from American Intercontinental University, magna cum laude, with a BFA in visual communications.  She is the author of I Am Who I Am, an illustrated children's book teaching self-worth and confidence.

Career 
Grigsby worked as a commercial print model in 1998, modeling for companies such as Tempur-Pedic, Apple, United Airlines, Sony, T-Mobile etc.  Aside from modeling, she also worked as a freelance web designer and photographer specializing in animal and product photography.

In June 2005, Grigsby founded Briofive, a graphic and web design company, which by 2014, had developed into a personal branding photography studio.  Her photography style is exclusively focused around showing industry leaders and entrepreneurs as confident experts in their fields.  Through her work, Grigsby aims to help women find their self-worth and confidence; from that emerged her unique style of photography—the Empowerment Portrait.  Grigsby's work has been featured in the Los Angeles Times, the Cape Cod Times, and Racked San Francisco.

Grigsby began working as a freelance photographer in 2001 and worked with organizations across the United States including Cheryl Saban's Self-Worth Foundation and San Francisco Fleet Week.  In 2008, she started Dogchatter Inc., an online retail store and magazine featuring photography of her own household pets.  The website was closed in 2017.

Grigsby has spoken at TEDxJHUDC presenting her talk, Photographs of the Invisible.  She has also spoken at Dress for Success, UN Women, and the Winning Edge World Conference. Additionally, Grigsby has spoken as a personal branding image expert on notable podcasts such as MindValley and Kwikbrain.

Grigsby runs a podcast, Life in Focus with Sandy Grigsby, covering topics including self-worth and entrepreneurship. It has featured Dr. Bill Dorfman, Jim Kwik, Lisa Scaffiti, and Ken Rutkowski. In October 2022, she became an official instructor with LinkedIn Learning, formerly Lynda.com.  Her course titled Creating Your Online Image walks people through the process of creating the visual aspects of their personal brand.

References

External links 
 Sandyinfocus Website
 Brio Five Website
TEDx Photographs of the Invisible

American InterContinental University alumni
21st-century American photographers
Living people
American models
Year of birth missing (living people)